Letterbox company may refer to:
 Brass plate company, company lacking meaningful connection with the location of incorporation
 Shell corporation, company that exists only on paper and has no office and no employees
 A business that makes letterboxes